Melia is an unincorporated community in Sarpy County, Nebraska, United States.

Melia was named in honor of an early settler. It was a station on the Chicago, Burlington, and Quincy Railroad.

Demographics

References

Unincorporated communities in Sarpy County, Nebraska
Unincorporated communities in Nebraska